A schooner is a type of glass for serving drinks. In the United Kingdom it is the name for a large sherry glass. In Australia it is the name for a particular glass size, used for any type of beer.

United Kingdom
In Britain, a schooner is a large sherry glass. Sherry is traditionally served in one of two measures: a clipper, the smaller measure, or a schooner, the larger measure, both named after the sort of ships that brought sherry over from Spain. The schooner name was more particular to Bristol, to where most sherry was imported, stored and bottled. It is usually served on its own. 

Also, since 2011, beer and cider have been permitted to be sold in  glasses known by drinkers as 'schooners', though these are not defined as such in UK legislation.

Newcastle Brown Ale is traditionally served in a  glass called a schooner, or 'Geordie schooner'.

Australia

It is the most common size in New South Wales, Queensland and the Northern Territory, although it is known in other states. Some hospitality venues in Western Australia are going through a process of "schoonerification", whereby the previous culture of drinking by pints has been changed with vessels of schooner size to allay increasing costs to venues and with encouragement from the state government to curb binge drinking.

There is no legal definition of a schooner in Australia, with the volume of beer served depending on the venue. A calibrated 425 ml glass may be used and filled to the brim, resulting in a "schooner" of 375 ml of beer and 50 ml of froth.

Canada 
In Canada, a "schooner" refers to a large capacity beer glass. Unlike the Australian schooner, which is smaller than a pint, a Canadian schooner is larger. Although not standardised, the most common size of schooner served in Canadian bars is 33.3 Imp fl oz / . It is commonly a tankard-shaped glass (dimpled mug shape with handle), rather than a traditional pint glass. It shouldn't be confused with Schooner Lager, which is a regional brand of beer found only in the eastern maritime provinces of Canada.

United States
In most places in the United States, "schooner" refers to the shape of the glass (rounded with a short stem), rather than the capacity.

In the Pacific Northwest, "schooner" refers to a smaller size pour, usually 8 to 12 ounces. It's often available off-menu.

References

External links

Dr. Brett. J. Stubbs Schooner Wars

Drinking glasses
Beer glassware
Beer in Australia